Fin Komodo is a buggy-type car produced by PT Fin Komodo Teknologi (PT FKT). The buggy is targeted toward recreation and tourism markets.

Description 
The Fin Komodo is an off-road vehicle designed by ex-IPTN engineer, Ibnu Susilo, with the aim to be light-weight while being able to carry a heavy load.

Before being launched, PT FKT made 4 prototypes. The first and second prototypes used a 180cc two-stroke engine and 3-speed transmission. The first prototype was designed with a single seat while the second prototype was designed with 2 chairs. Both of these prototypes had an oil capacity of 0.3 liters, fuel capacity of 15 liters of gasoline, used a seamless tubular frame and trunk, and generated torques of 1.19 kg / 3000 rpm (11.7 Nm / 3000 rpm).

The third and fourth prototypes used a 250 cc four-stroke engine with a torque of 17.6 Nm per 5500 rpm. The capacity of the fuel tank increased to 20 liters. The engine in the third prototype used an automatic transmission consisting of high speed, low speed, neutral, and reverse, while the fourth prototype uses an automatic CVT transmission (forward, neutral, and reverse).

The first and second generations have an empty weight of 250 kg, while the third and fourth generations have an empty weight of 320 kg. The frame used on the fourth generation is a tubular frame.

The fourth prototype went into production under the name Komodo KD 250 AT.

KD 250 AT 

The first production run of Komodo used an engine named "Fin Power" which was designed by PT FKT. This engine has a 250 cc two-cylinder motor which can produce 14 HP / 7000 RPM and 17.6 Nm / 5500  RPM of torque. Despite the Indonesian design, the engine was made in China because there is no Indonesian manufacturer that can produce engines. The frame is tubular, with double wishbone independent suspension named "Fin Absorber".

The KD 250 AT has hydraulic disc brakes, and the steering system uses a rack and pinion system. It is equipped with an automatic transmission (forward, neutral and reverse) and rear-wheel drive. The maximum speed that can be achieved is 60 km/h.

KIT 250 AT 

The Komodo KIT (Combat Reconnaissance Vehicle) 250 AT is a military version intended for reconnaissance. First appeared in Indo Defense 2014, this vehicle was developed by Dislitbang AD with PT FKT. Weighing 600 kg, the Komodo KIT can be loaded into military cargo aircraft, such as the C-130 Hercules. Weapons that can be installed include the FN Minimi (calibre 5.56 mm) or FN MAG (calibre 7.62 mm), with 360 degrees rotation. The military version is equipped with a winch.

KD 250 X 

The KD 250 X is the Fin Komodo which was first introduced at IIMS 2017, on May 1, 2017. The KD 250 X is generally seen as the civil version of Komodo KIT, as seen by its more angular fairing shape when compared to the KD 250 AT. The KD 250 X is a facelift of the KD 250 AT. The volume of the cabin is increased, the dashboard configuration has been changed, and the seat has been upgraded to be safer and more comfortable than previous versions. The engine and some other components did not change.

Bledhex 
The Bledhex is an electric variant of Fin Komodo KD 250 X, first shown at IIMS 2021 (15–25 April 2021). The name comes from Javanese word bledeg meaning lightning. The body of the vehicle is made of polycarbonate with a tubular frame. The electric motor has a power of 20 kW, a torque of 70 Nm, and a top speed of 40 km/h. The battery has a capacity of 21 kWh and can be fully charged in 3 hours. Cruising range is 150–200 km depending on the track.

See also 
 Dune buggy
 Pindad Komodo

References

External links 
 Fin Komodo Official Website
 Fin Komodo Official Instagram
 Fin Komodo Videos

Vehicles introduced in 2019
Pickup trucks
Rear-wheel-drive vehicles
Military vehicles introduced in the 2010s
Off-road vehicles